Pingale is a surname. Notable people with the surname include:

Bahiroji Pingale, Peshwa of Maratha Empire 1708–1711
Devidas Anandrao Pingale (born 1961), Indian politician
Manoj Pingale (born 1967), Indian boxer
Moreshvar Pingale (died 1689), Peshwa of Maratha Empire 1683–1689